Jordan Creek is a  tributary of the Owyhee River in the northwestern United States. It generally flows west from near Silver City, Idaho, in the Owyhee Mountains to near Rome in the Oregon High Desert. Major tributaries are Big Boulder, Soda, Louse, Spring, Rock, Meadow, Combination, and Louisa creeks in Idaho and Cow Creek in Oregon. The creek is named for Michael M. Jordan, who led a party that discovered gold along the creek in 1863.

Watershed
Although the upper parts of the basin in the Silver City Mountain Range supported mining camps and towns in the late 19th century through the early 20th century, they were generally abandoned when the gold and silver played out. Much of the population in the 21st century lives on small homesteads, ranches, and farms scattered throughout the watershed. Jordan Valley, Oregon, is the basin's only population center that has permanent, year-round residents, while Silver City has mostly part-time or weekend residents.

Land use in the watershed is divided among irrigated agriculture, range land, forests, mining, and riparian zones. The primary uses are cow-calf grazing in the uplands and hay production in the irrigated lowlands. To control water flow for irrigation, most of the watershed's hydrology has been modified to some degree by large reservoirs in Oregon and in-stream diversions in Idaho.

Discharge
This flow came from slightly less than 46 percent of the total watershed.

See also
 List of rivers of Oregon
 List of longest streams of Oregon
 List of rivers of Idaho
 List of longest streams of Idaho

References

Works cited
 Idaho Department of Environmental Quality (DEQ). (2009). Jordan Creek Subbasin Assessment and Total Maximum Daily Load (PDF). Retrieved September 12, 2010.
 McArthur, Lewis A., and McArthur, Lewis L. (2003) [1928]. Oregon Geographic Names, 7th ed. Portland: Oregon Historical Society Press. .
 National Resources Conservation Service (NRCS) (2010). Jordan – 17050108, 8 Digit Hydrologic Unit Profile (PDF). Retrieved September 10, 2010.

Rivers of Idaho
Rivers of Oregon
Owyhee River
Rivers of Malheur County, Oregon
Rivers of Owyhee County, Idaho